Yasmin Ingham (born 13 May 1997) is a British equestrian. In 2022 Ingham won individual gold at the World Eventing Championships riding Banzai du Loir.

Early life
Ingham was born and raised on the Isle of Man where her mother Lesley was a manager of a large equestrian centre called Kennaa. Ingham said her first words were "on it" when she was petting her mother’s horse, Remy.

Career
Ingham joined the Isle of Man branch of the Pony Club and competed in hunter showing classes and qualified for the Royal International Horse Show and Horse of the Year Show before deciding she wanted to concentrate on eventing in 2010. In 2012, riding Craig Mor Tom in Fontainebleau she competed for the first time for the British team at the Pony European Eventing Championships. They did so again in 2013 in Arezzo, Italy where they won both individual and team gold medals. In 2013 she was named Isle of Man Sportswoman of the Year. In 2015, riding Mary King's former Mount Imperial Cavalier (or 'Archie') she won the British national junior title. In 2018, riding Rehy DJ Ingham won the National Young Rider Championships at Houghton Hall and then finished fourth at the Young Rider Europeans in Fontainebleau. In 2019 Ingham won her fourth age-group British championships when riding Sandman 7 they triumphed in the under-25 British Championship. 

Ingham made her five-star in the spring of 2022 in Kentucky and finished second behind Michael Jung and his horse FischerChipmunk. In 2022 on her senior World Championship debut, Ingham clinched individual gold at the World Eventing Championships riding Banzai du Loir.

References

1997 births
Living people
Manx people
21st-century Manx people
Manx sportswomen
 British female equestrians
British event riders